Edgerton is a village in Williams County, Ohio, United States in the extreme northwest corner of the state. The population was 2,012 at the 2010 census.

History
The area around Edgerton was organized as St. Joseph Township on December 2, 1832. Edgerton was platted in 1854. The village was named after Alfred P. Edgerton, a land agent. A post office was established in 1854. The village was incorporated on December 4, 1865.

Geography
Edgerton is located at  (41.449331, -84.746823). The St. Joseph River lies along the eastern edge of the village.

Demographics

2010 census
As of the census of 2010, there were 2,012 people, 791 households, and 554 families living in the village. The racial makeup of the village was 97.7% White, 0.2% African American, 0.1% Native American, 0.4% Asian, 0.6% from other races, and 0.8% from two or more races. Hispanic or Latino of any race were 2.5% of the population.

There were 791 households, of which 34.1% had children under the age of 18 living with them, 50.7% were married couples living together, 13.4% had a female householder with no husband present, 5.9% had a male householder with no wife present, and 30.0% were non-families. 26.2% of all households were made up of individuals, and 12% had someone living alone who was 65 years of age or older. The average household size was 2.44 and the average family size was 2.88.

The median age in the village was 41.3 years. 24.6% of residents were under the age of 18; 7% were between the ages of 18 and 24; 23.3% were from 25 to 44; 27.5% were from 45 to 64; and 17.8% were 65 years of age or older. The gender makeup of the village was 47.3% male and 52.7% female.

2000 census
As of the census of 2000, there were 2,117 people, 812 households, and 568 families living in the village. The population density was 1,137.8 people per square mile (439.5/km2). There were 862 housing units at an average density of 463.3 per square mile (178.9/km2). The racial makeup of the village was 97.45% White, 0.19% African American, 0.09% Native American, 0.05% Asian, 0.05% Pacific Islander, 0.90% from other races, and 1.28% from two or more races. Hispanic or Latino of any race were 2.08% of the population.

There were 812 households, out of which 33.5% had children under the age of 18 living with them, 54.2% were married couples living together, 11.3% had a female householder with no husband present, and 30.0% were non-families. 25.2% of all households were made up of individuals, and 12.4% had someone living alone who was 65 years of age or older. The average household size was 2.52 and the average family size was 3.01.

In the village, the population was spread out, with 26.8% under the age of 18, 8.5% from 18 to 24, 27.8% from 25 to 44, 20.7% from 45 to 64, and 16.2% who were 65 years of age or older. The median age was 36 years. For every 100 females there were 90.7 males. For every 100 females age 18 and over, there were 83.4 males.

The median income for a household in the village was $38,750, and the median income for a family was $45,865. Males had a median income of $32,456 versus $23,646 for females. The per capita income for the village was $17,690. About 6.3% of families and 8.9% of the population were below the poverty line, including 13.4% of those under age 18 and 8.7% of those age 65 or over.

Education
Edgerton Local Schools District operates one elementary school and Edgerton High School.

Edgerton has a public library, a branch of the Williams County Public Library.

References

Villages in Williams County, Ohio
Villages in Ohio